Institute of Information Technology Bogura (IITB) is a polytechnic at Sherpur Road, Bogura, Bangladesh, established in 2000.

The institute is recognized by the Board of Technical Education, Dhaka, Bangladesh. The average graduating class from Institute of Information Technology Bogura (IITB)  each year has 400 to 600 students.

The institute has a campus with a play-ground for soccer, basketball, cricket, volleyball, badminton and so on. The school basketball court also serves as a multipurpose auditorium.

Selection of students
Students are generally chosen for every department with written & viva through an admission test. The students who score the highest are admitted in the school. Generally around 100 students from a total of 900-1000 are admitted each year, around fifty-five for each three section.

Department
Garments Design and Pattern Making
Textile
Electrical
Electronics
Computer
Telecommunication
Mechanical
Civil
Architecture

References

Polytechnic institutes in Bangladesh
Information technology in Bangladesh
Bogura District